Pascal Clément (12 May 1945 – 21 June 2020) was a French politician, member of the UMP. He was a member of the National Assembly of France for the sixth district, encompassing the Loire. He served as Minister of Parliamentary Relations from 1993 to 1995, and Minister of Justice from 2005 to 2007.

Biography
Pascal Clément was born on 12 May 1945 in Boulogne-Billancourt, France.

He was first elected to the National Assembly of France in 1978, where he served until 1993. From March 1993 to May 1995, he served as Minister of Parliamentary Relations. In June 1995, he joined the National Assembly again after Jacques Cyprès stepped down, and he served until 2005. From June 2005 to May 2007, he served as Minister of Justice.

On a more local level, he served as Mayor of Saint-Marcel-de-Félines from 1977 to 2001, and as councillor from 2001 to 2008. He also served as Vice President of the General Council of the Loire from 1982 to 1994, and as its president from 1994 to 2008.

In 2009, he clashed with Nora Berra after he allegedly said "The day there will be as many minarets as cathedrals, this country won't be France any more." Both Berra and Nathalie Kosciusko-Morizet left the room as they found it anti-Muslim, though he later denied he ever said that.

Death 
Pascal Clément died due to the lung infection and Pascal's COVID-19 reports were negative according to the family.

Bibliography
Les Partis politiques minoritaires aux États-Unis (2000)
Persigny, L'homme qui a inventé Napoléon III (2006)
La VIe République ou la Confusion des esprits (2007)

References

1945 births
2020 deaths
Deaths from pneumonia in France
Union for a Popular Movement politicians
French Ministers of Justice
Sciences Po alumni
People from Boulogne-Billancourt
Politicians from Île-de-France
Deputies of the 12th National Assembly of the French Fifth Republic
Deputies of the 13th National Assembly of the French Fifth Republic
Chevaliers of the Légion d'honneur
Officers of the Order of Saint-Charles